Peter Stumpp (c. 1535 – 1589; name is also spelled as Peter Stube, Peter Stubbe, Peter Stübbe or Peter Stumpf) was a German farmer and alleged serial killer, accused of werewolfery, witchcraft and cannibalism. He was known as 'the Werewolf of Bedburg'.

Sources 
The most comprehensive source on the case is a 16-page pamphlet published in London in 1590, the translation of a German print of which no copies have survived. The English pamphlet, of which two copies exist (one in the British Museum and one in the Lambeth Library), was rediscovered by occultist Montague Summers in 1920. It describes Stumpp's life, alleged crimes and the trial, and includes many statements from neighbours and witnesses on the crimes. Summers reprints the entire pamphlet, including a woodcut, on pages 253 to 259 of his work The Werewolf.

Additional information is provided by the diaries of Hermann von Weinsberg, a Cologne alderman, and by a number of illustrated broadsheets, which were printed in southern Germany and were probably based on the German version of the London pamphlet. The original documents seem to have been lost during the wars of the centuries that followed.

Contemporary reference was made to the pamphlet by Edward Fairfax in his firsthand account of the alleged witch persecution of his own daughters in 1621.

Life and career 
Although the exact place and date of Peter Stumpp's birth is unknown, examining sources likely puts it near Bedburg, Germany around 1530. Stumpp's name is also spelled as Peter Stube, Peter Stub, Peter Stubbe, Peter Stübbe or Peter Stumpf, and other aliases include such names as Abal Griswold, Abil Griswold, and Ubel Griswold. The name "Stump" or "Stumpf" may have been given him as a reference to the fact that his left hand had been cut off, leaving only a stump, in German "Stumpf".  It was alleged that as the "werewolf" had its left forepaw cut off, then the same injury proved the guilt of the man. Stumpp was born at the village of Epprath near the country-town of Bedburg in the Electorate of Cologne. His actual date of birth is not known, as the local church registers were destroyed during the Thirty Years' War (1618–1648). Stump was likely a Protestant. He was a wealthy farmer of his rural community. During the 1580s, he seems to have been a widower with two children; a girl called Beele (Sybil), who seems to have been older than 15 years old, and a son of an unknown age.

Accusations 
During 1589, Stumpp had one of the most lurid and famous werewolf trials in history. After being stretched on a rack, and before further torture commenced, he confessed to having practiced black magic since he was 12 years old. He claimed that the Devil had given him a magical belt or girdle, which enabled him to metamorphose into "the likeness of a greedy, devouring wolf, strong and mighty, with eyes great and large, which in the night sparkled like fire, a mouth great and wide, with most sharp and cruel teeth, a huge body, and mighty paws." Removing the belt, he said, made him transform back to his human form. After his capture, he told the local magistrate he had left the girdle in a "certain valley". The magistrate sent for it to be retrieved but no such belt was ever found.

For 25 years, Stumpp had allegedly been an "insatiable bloodsucker" who gorged on the flesh of goats, lambs, and sheep, as well as men, women, and children. Being threatened with torture, he confessed to killing and eating 14 children, 2 pregnant women, whose fetuses he ripped from their wombs and "ate their hearts panting hot and raw," which he later described as "dainty morsels." One of the 14 children was his own son, whose brain he was reported to have devoured. Stumpp loved his son dearly but in the end his bloodlust prevailed. Allegedly, he went out with his son into the woods, transformed into the likeness of a wolf and devoured him.

Not only was Stumpp accused of being a serial murderer and cannibal, but also of having an incestuous relationship with his daughter, who was sentenced to die with him, and that he had coupled with a distant relative, which was also considered to be incestuous according to the law. In addition to this, he confessed to having had intercourse with a succubus sent to him by the Devil.

Execution 

The execution of Stumpp, on 31 October 1589, alongside his daughter Beele (Sybil) and mistress, Katherine, is one of the most brutal on record: he was put to a wheel, where "flesh was torn from his body", in ten places, with red-hot pincers, followed by his arms and legs. Then his limbs were broken with the blunt side of an axehead to prevent him from returning from the grave, before he was beheaded and his body burned on a pyre. His daughter and mistress had already been flayed and strangled, and were burned along with Stumpp's body. As a warning against similar behavior, local authorities erected a pole with the torture wheel and the figure of a wolf on it, and at the very top they placed Peter Stumpp's severed head.

In popular culture
The U.S. metal band Macabre recorded a song about Peter Stumpp, titled "The Werewolf of Bedburg"; it can be found on the Murder Metal album.
The German horror punk band The Other recorded a song about Peter Stumpp, titled "Werewolf of Bedburg" on their Casket Case album.
In the Pine Deep Trilogy of novelist and folklorist Jonathan Maberry, Peter Stumpp is the supernatural villain Ubel Griswold. Since Griswold is actually one of Stumpp's historical aliases, Maberry decided to use the name of Ubel Griswold instead of openly telling people that the villain was the infamous werewolf Peter Stumpp until later on in the third book of the series, Bad Moon Rising.
A reference to Peter Stumpp is also made in William Peter Blatty's book, The Exorcist. When Father Karras and Kinderman talk about Satanism they say "Terrible, was this theory, Father, or fact?" "Well, there's William Stumpf, for example. Or Peter. I can't remember. Anyway, a German in the sixteenth century who thought he was a werewolf".
The direct-to-video Big Top Scooby-Doo!, uses a portion of Lukas Mayer's woodcut of the execution of Stumpp in 1589, though in the movie no mention of Stumpp is made. The portion used depicts a man cutting off a werewolf's left paw (supposedly Stumpp in werewolf form) and a child being attacked by a werewolf. The woodcut scene shown in the film restores the werewolf's left paw and removes the child in the second werewolf's jaws, making it appear as if the swordsman is fighting one of the werewolves while another flees.
In the Doctor Who audio drama Loups-Garoux, Pieter Stubbe was in fact a werewolf. He managed to escape before he was executed and lived for another 5 centuries. He was defeated by the Fifth Doctor in Brazil in 2080. It is implied that he ate both the Grand Duchess Anastasia and Lord Lucan.
The story of Peter Stumpp was also told in episode 3 of the podcast Lore, released on April 6, 2015. In 2017, the podcast episode was adapted into the 5th episode of the TV series adaptation of Lore, where he was played by Adam Goldberg.
Reference is made to Stubbe Peter in Chapter 17 of Deborah Harkness's Shadow of Night—the second novel in her All Souls Trilogy. His trial and execution are reported in a pamphlet that the protagonists take as signs witches and vampires are under greater threat than expected. Werewolves are seen in the book as a human fable based on sightings and experiences with the wolf-esque vampires of the book's world.
In the TV series Friends from College, Stumpp is discussed and used as reference for a YA novel in season 1, episode 7 "Grand Cayman".
 In the 2022 film Torn, the character of Peter Stube is loosely based on the historical personage.

See also
List of serial killers before 1900
List of German serial killers
 Hans the Werewolf
 Gilles Garnier
 Werewolf of Châlons
Henry Gardinn

References

Further reading
The Damnable Life and Death of One Stubbe Peeter, a Most Wicked Sorcerer

 Anonymous (1590)   London. (original English version).
 Everitt, David (1993) Human Monsters: An Illustrated Encyclopedia of the World's Most Vicious Murderers New York: McGraw-Hill. pp. 15–18 
Farson, Daniel and Hall, Angus (1975) Mysterious Monsters- pg.53-4. 
Argues for Peter Stumpp being innocent
 Kremer, Peter (2003) "Plädoyer für einen Werwolf: Der Fall Peter Stübbe", in Wo das Grauen lauert. Blutsauger und kopflose Reiter, Werwölfe und Wiedergänger an Inde, Erft und Rur. Dueren. pp. 247–270. 
Punset, Eduardo (2006) "El alma está en el cerebro" (punto de lectura) Redes RTVE.
 Sidky, Homayun (1997) Witchcraft, Lycanthropy, Drugs, and Disease: An Anthropological Study of the European Witch-Hunts. New York. pp. 234–238. .
 Various (2009) "The Bogeyman's Gonna Eat You: Albert Fish, The Vampire of Brooklyn". America's Serial Killers: Portraits in Evil Mill Creek Entertainment.
English Translations From the German Cologne and Nuremberg broadsheets.
Truthful and Frightening Description of the many Sorcerers or Witches: An English Translation of a 1598 Cologne pamphlet

1589 deaths
16th-century executions in the Holy Roman Empire
Executed German serial killers
Executed people from North Rhine-Westphalia
Filicides in Germany
German cannibals
German murderers of children
Incest
Male serial killers
People executed by breaking wheel
People executed by the Electorate of Cologne
People executed for witchcraft
People from Rhein-Erft-Kreis
Werewolves
Witch trials in Germany
Year of birth uncertain
Year of birth unknown